Gramella antarctica is a Gram-negative, rod-shaped aerobic and motile bacterium from the genus of Gramella which has been isolated from surface sediments from the Ross Sea.

References

Flavobacteria
Bacteria described in 2018